The Netherlands men's national under-18 basketball team is the national junior representative for the Netherlands in international under-18 basketball tournaments. They are governed by Basketball Nederland. The team competes at the FIBA U18 European Championship, with the opportunity to qualify for the FIBA Under-19 World Cup.  The current coach is Paul Vervaeck.

In 2018, the team won its first medal when it won gold at the 2018 FIBA U18 European Championship Division B tournament. Following their victory, the Netherlands were promoted to Division A.

Competitive record

U18 European Championship

U18 European Championship Division B

Individual awards
Under-18 Championship Division B MVP
Nathan Kuta – 2018

See also
Netherlands men's national basketball team
Netherlands men's national under-16 basketball team

References

External links
Official website 
FIBA profile

Basketball teams in the Netherlands
Men's national under-18 basketball teams
B